Habenaria tridactylites (Canary Three-finger Orchid) is a species of flowering plant in the family Orchidaceae, native to the Canary Islands. It was first described by John Lindley in 1835.

Description
Habenaria tridactylites is a terrestrial orchid. The upper perianth segments form a "helmet". The lowest petal forms the lip, which is deeply divided into three very long lobes. The flower also has a long spur.

Distribution and habitat
Habenaria tridactylites is endemic to the Canary Islands. In Tenerife, it is found on forested hillsides in the lower zone; in Gran Canaria, it occurs at elevations of 200–800 m; it also occurs in the other islands – La Gomera, La Palma, El Hierro, Lanzarote and Fuerteventura.

References

External links 
 

tridactylites
Flora of the Canary Islands
Plants described in 1835